The 1930 World Table Tennis Championships women's doubles was the third edition of the women's doubles championship.
Mária Mednyánszky and Anna Sipos defeated Magda Gál and Márta Komáromi in the final by three sets to nil.

Results

See also
List of World Table Tennis Championships medalists

References

-
World
Table